Gary Robert Lavelle (born January 3, 1949) is a retired professional baseball pitcher who played in Major League Baseball from 1974 to 1987.

Career
Lavelle grew up in Pennsylvania, where he attended Liberty High School in Bethlehem, Pennsylvania.

Lavelle spent the majority of his Major League career with the San Francisco Giants, and also played for the Toronto Blue Jays and Oakland Athletics before retiring in 1987. He posted a career high 13 wins in 1978 and accumulated 136 saves in his 13-season career.

Lavelle lives in Virginia Beach, Virginia and coaches baseball at the Virginia Beach campus of Bryant & Stratton College. 
Lavelle previously was the head coach at Greenbrier Christian Academy in Chesapeake, Virginia, earning his 500th victory in April 2014.  He retired from Greenbrier Christian after the 2016 season.

Personal life
Lavelle became a born again Christian during his playing career.

See also
List of Major League Baseball leaders in games finished

References

External links
, or Retrosheet

1949 births
Living people
American expatriate baseball players in Canada
Arizona Instructional League Giants players
Baseball coaches from Pennsylvania
Baseball players from Pennsylvania
Amarillo Giants players
Decatur Commodores players
Dunedin Blue Jays players
Liberty High School (Bethlehem, Pennsylvania) alumni
Major League Baseball pitchers
Medford Giants players
Minor league baseball coaches
National League All-Stars
Oakland Athletics players
Phoenix Giants players
Salt Lake City Giants players
San Francisco Giants players
Sportspeople from Bethlehem, Pennsylvania
Sportspeople from Scranton, Pennsylvania
Tigres de Aragua players
American expatriate baseball players in Venezuela
Toronto Blue Jays players
American evangelicals